Thierry Henri Philippe Baudet (born 28 January 1983) is a Dutch far-right politician, author and self-declared conspiracy theorist. He is the founder and leader of Forum for Democracy (FvD), and has been a member of the House of Representatives since 2017. He also serves as the party's parliamentary leader. He is a controversial politician due to his political views, his promotion of conspiracy theories and disinformation, and his use of personal attacks against his opponents.

Early life
Baudet was born in Heemstede into a family of partial Walloon ancestry. 

Baudet attended a Haarlem gymnasium, a college preparatory school with compulsory Latin and Ancient Greek. His first degree, from the University of Amsterdam, was in history, and from 2007 to 2012 he was a PhD student at Leiden University, where in 2012 he graduated as a Doctor of Philosophy with a thesis on national identity, European identity, and multiculturalism. The dissertation was directed by Leiden professor Paul Cliteur and the British philosopher Roger Scruton and was published in Dutch as The Attack on the Nation-State. An English translation was also published, called The Significance of Borders.

Career

Baudet was a post-doctoral fellow at Tilburg University in 2013. He also wrote a newspaper column in NRC Handelsblad from 2011 to 2012.

In 2016, he founded the Forum for Democracy (FvD), which became a political party, and he was elected along with Theo Hiddema to the House of Representatives in the 2017 general election.

Baudet had his personal piano installed in his parliamentary office in the Hague. In 2018, he said that his current girlfriend was an Iranian refugee.

In 2018, he was awarded the Prize for Liberty by the Flemish classical-liberal think tank Libera!.

Political views
Baudet is a national conservative and Eurosceptic, advocating for both the Netherlands' exit from the European Union and the eventual dissolution of the EU. He is against unskilled immigration into the Netherlands. In a speech he described immigration as causing a homeopathic dilution of the Dutch culture, and in an interview said he wants to preserve the native cultures and ethnicities of Europe as they are. 

Baudet is opposed to the European Union–Ukraine Association Agreement. Together with GeenStijl and the Burgercomité EU association, Forum for Democracy was one of the behind the campaign to collect the signatures required for the 2016 Dutch Ukraine–European Union Association Agreement referendum. Baudet and Forum for Democracy campaigned for the "No"-vote in this referendum. During the campaign, Baudet at multiple occasions spread fake news, including false reports of purported crimes by the Ukrainian military, and associated himself with pro-Russian activist Vladimir Kornilov.

In November 2016, Baudet co-signed a letter, initiated by the journalists Billy Six and Joost Niemöller, which questioned the independence of the MH17 investigations and requested Donald Trump to press for a new investigation. This led to criticism from surviving relatives. In May 2018, he supported the Dutch cabinet in holding Russia accountable for the MH17 shootdown incident. Baudet's WhatsApp chats were leaked to the media in 2020; these revealed his close contacts with Vladimir Kornilov, who Baudet described as "a Russian paid by Putin", and demonstrated a significant influence of Kornilov on Baudet's actions on Ukraine, the referendum and future anti-NATO campaigns. In the chats with his FvD colleagues, Baudet also alluded to financial support from Kornilov. Baudet disagreed with the conclusions drawn from these texts, and said that the text messages were quoted out of context. In February 2022, after Russia officially recognized separatist regions in Ukraine as independent nations and deployed military troops to the Donbas, Baudet voiced his approval of Vladimir Putin's actions. On 24 February 2022, during the Russian invasion of Ukraine, Baudet stated that Russia was "unnecessarily being vilified". During a debate in parliament on February 28, he explicitly refused to condemn the invasion. In August 2022, Baudet described Putin as "a huge hero" fighting a "heroic" fight against "globalists".

Baudet has strong opinions on the arts, the topic of his book Oikofobie; he considers non-Western art and Western post-1900 modernism in visual arts inferior to Western Realism, encourages education and programmation of tonal music opposed to atonal music, and dislikes modern post-1950 architecture. In reaction to this, musicologist Yuri Landman warned Baudet for approaching the concept of degenerate art with his conservative criticism.

Baudet frequently speaks about the perceived existence of a "party cartel", in which the main ruling parties of the Netherlands divide power among themselves and conspire towards the same goals, despite claiming to be competitors. 

He is not religious, but he expressed sympathy for Christianity on several occasions. In an interview in 2017, he called himself an "agnostic cultural Christian". In an interview in 2022, however, he distanced himself from this religion, saying it's a belief "for losers" that "lacks masculinity."<ref>Dutch MP Baudet distances from Christianity, CNE News", 19 October 2022</ref>

Baudet is critical of Islam and has expressed concern about both high levels and lack of assimilation of migrants from Islamic societies. He has stated his disagreement with the proposals made by another Dutch politician, Geert Wilders, to ban copies of the Quran. Meanwhile, he also praised Wilders as someone who "has put on the agenda the significant problem that we have with radical Islam in our time and Muslim immigration". Baudet has called for Islamic schools in the Netherlands to sign up with Western values. He has criticised both Dutch and wider European handling of immigration and assimilation. During the 2017 Dutch general election, Baudet was one of the few Dutch politicians who said he would form a coalition with Wilders' Party for Freedom. Baudet has also expressed admiration for murdered Dutch politician Pim Fortuyn, and both ideological and personality comparisons between the two men have been made by both Dutch and overseas media.

In February 2018, Baudet was confronted with the question of whether there is a relation between IQ and race in a debate with Femke Halsema. Hiddema and the number two on Baudet's party list for the 2018 Dutch municipal elections in Amsterdam, Yernaz Ramautarsing, stated they believed it to be true while Baudet refused to answer the question. Deputy Prime Minister Kajsa Ollongren stated that Forum for Democracy is a bigger threat than the Party for Freedom and that members have an unhealthy fascination for race differences; Baudet made a complaint for defamation at an Amsterdam police station. Hiddema supported him as his advocate. In February 2021, Elsevier reported it had uncovered WhatsApp messages sent by Baudet to fellow party members, in which he claims white people have a higher IQ than Hispanics and African-Americans. Baudet and several other members reportedly also sent messages in which they used racial slurs and expressed their opposition to interracial relationships.

Baudet is an adherent of the Cultural Marxism conspiracy theory that suggests a calculated effort to destroy Western culture by academic and intellectual means. Baudet accuses the European Union of being "a Cultural Marxist project, with the aim of destroying European Civilization".

Baudet has been alleged to have stated that COVID-19 was introduced by George Soros to "steal freedom", a claim he denies. He has also allegedly made anti-semitic comments. Following these claims in November 2020, published by one of his party's Senators, Baudet temporarily resigned as leader of the party and the party allegedly split. Soon he returned as party leader, but by then many party members had left Forum for Democracy, including the majority of the Senators and all of the party's members of the European Parliament.

In 2021, Baudet responded to an article about the migrant population of Brussels by tweeting that an "escape-strategy, Madagascar or something" was needed. This was widely perceived as a reference to the Madagascar Plan, the plan by the government of Nazi Germany to forcibly relocate the entire European Jewish population to Madagascar.

Baudet and Members of Parliament of his party have repeatedly compared measures to combat the spread of COVID-19 to the persecution of Jews by Nazi Germany. In May 2021, this led to another split in the party. In September 2021, Baudet attended a protest against the measures to combat COVID-19, in which several protesters wore Jewish badges, which drew condemnation. This led five Jewish organisations to ask parliament to explicitly distance itself from comparisons of the measures with the persecution of Jews and the Holocaust. In response, Baudet issued a tweet in which he stated that Jewish organisations "do not own the war", and wrote the word Holocaust within quotation marks, which was interpreted as an antisemitic dog whistle. Baudet was widely condemned by other politicians and Jewish organisations. He is pro-Russian, and has said that the 2022 war in Ukraine is the fault of the West. He also stated that the September 11 attacks were false flag operations, implemented by the government of the USA.

In an October 2022 interview, Baudet promoted the conspiracy theory that the world is controlled by "evil reptilians". He also said he was a fan of Vladimir Putin, whom he called "a hero we need". He said the Russian president is the only one who can take on the elite. He believes Putin must win the war against Ukraine and says "we must do everything we can to support him".

 Published works
2010: (ed. with Michiel Visser) Conservatieve Vooruitgang. De grootste denkers van de 20ste eeuw (Conservative progress. The greatest thinkers of the 20th century). Prometheus/Bert Bakker.
2011: (ed. with Michiel Visser) Revolutionair Verval en de conservatieve vooruitgang in de 18de en 19de eeuw (Revolutionary decline and conservative progress in the 18th and 19th centuries). Prometheus/Bert Bakker.
2012: Pro Europa dus tegen de EU (Pro Europe therefore against the EU). Elsevier
2012: The Significance of Borders. Why representative government and the rule of law require nation-states. Brill Academic Publishers. PhD dissertation
2012: De aanval op de natiestaat (The attack on the nation state). Prometheus/Bert Bakker.
2013: Oikofobie. De angst voor het eigene (Oikophobia. The fear of home). Prometheus/Bert Bakker.
2014: (ed. with Geert Mak) Thuis in de Tijd (At home in time). Prometheus/Bert Bakker. 
2014: (with Arie Boomsma) Van Bach tot Bernstein. Klassieke muziek voor iedereen (From Bach to Bernstein. Classical music for everyone). 
2014: Voorwaardelijke liefde (Conditional love. [Novel]). Amsterdam: Prometheus/Bert Bakker. 
2017: Breek het partijkartel! De noodzaak van referenda (Break the party cartel. The necessity of referendums). Amsterdam: Prometheus/Bert Bakker. 
2018: Van elk waarheen bevrijd (Delivered from all whereto. [Novel]). Amsterdam: Prometheus/Bert Bakker. 
2020: Politiek van het gezond verstand (Politics of common sense). Amsterdam: Amsterdam Books. 
2020: De ravage van tien jaar Rutte'' (The havoc of ten years' Rutte). Amsterdam: Amsterdam Books.

References

External links

 Thierry Baudet at the House of Representatives website
 Thierry Baudet (in Dutch) at the Forum for Democracy website

1983 births
Living people
21st-century Dutch male writers
21st-century Dutch non-fiction writers
21st-century Dutch politicians
Conservatism in the Netherlands
Dutch critics of Islam
Critics of multiculturalism
Dutch agnostics
Dutch anti-vaccination activists
Dutch biographers
Dutch bloggers
Dutch conspiracy theorists
Dutch historians of philosophy
Dutch magazine editors
Dutch male short story writers
Dutch opinion journalists
Dutch people of Indonesian descent
Dutch people of Walloon descent
Dutch political party founders
Dutch political writers
Dutch publishers (people)
21st-century Dutch short story writers
Forum for Democracy (Netherlands) politicians
Historians of the Netherlands
Leaders of political parties in the Netherlands
Leiden University alumni
Academic staff of Leiden University
Male biographers
Male bloggers
Members of the House of Representatives (Netherlands)
Party chairs of the Netherlands
People from Heemstede
Philosophy writers
Academic staff of Tilburg University
University of Amsterdam alumni
Voting theorists
Writers about activism and social change
Writers about direct democracy
Journalists from Amsterdam
Conspiracy theorists